The Vestas Sailrocket was built to capture the sailing speed record competing in the B-class for 150 to 235 square feet of sail. It is piloted by the project leader Paul Larsen and sponsored by Danish wind turbines manufacturer Vestas.

After being upgraded to a second version, the Vestas Sailrocket 2 began a campaign to break speed records in November 2012 off Walvis Bay, Namibia. On 12 November, it made a  run over a  distance, then  on the 16th. It attained  on a one-mile run on the 18th and simultaneously  on 500m. Both records are ratified by the World Sailing Speed Record Council (WSSRC) for the 500m and the mile.

A Swiss team of École Polytechnique Fédérale de Lausanne university students and engineers, including members involved in the development of previous record-holder Hydroptère, formed in October 2019 to develop a new hydrofoil boat, SP80, to exceed the Vestas Sailrocket 2 record in 2022, with a target speed of 80 knots.

See also

 Yellow Pages Endeavour
 Speed sailing record
 Speed sailing

References

External links
 Official website

Hydrofoils
Multihulls